The Austrian Space Forum (OeWF) is an expert organization in the field of analogue research, which researches how humans can prepare on Earth for astronautical exploration of other planets. Since the AustroMars mission in 2006, OeWF has been involved in analog research, developing space suit simulators and also conducting astronautical simulations on Earth. The resulting data is available to researchers from a wide range of disciplines in the Multi-Mission Science Data Archive 

The Forum itself is organised as an association and sees itself as a citizen science organisation where experts, space enthusiasts and members of various disciplines, together with national and international research institutions, industry and companies, conduct research. As one of the most important educational institutions in Austria, the ÖWF inspires young people towards space, science and technology.

AustroMars 

In 2006 the Austrian Space Forum conducted its first analogue mission called "AustroMars", a Mars analogue simulation at the Mars Desert Research Station in Utah. For the first time the crew, the support team and the experiments as well as the major part of the hardware came from Austria.

PolAres 

PolAres was a 2007–2017 interdisciplinary programme of the Austrian Space Forum in cooperation with international partners to develop strategies for human-robotic interaction procedures and to emphasise planetary protection, in preparation for a future human-robotic Mars surface expedition. Part of the PolAres program was developing an Mars analogue space suit. Since 2009 the Mars analogue space suit Aouda.X is developed and tested in several field tests and simulations.

Rio Tinto Simulation 2011 

Mars analogue field simulation in Southern Spain in April 2011, together with international experiments including ESA eurobot vehicle.

Dachstein Mars Simulation 2012 

A Mars Analogue-Field-test between 27 April and 1 May 2012, together with international partners. The test took place in the mammoth and giant ice caves in the Dachstein Area in Austria. Aside from testing the newest version of the Forum’s Spacesuit simulator Aouda.X, teams from 10 different nations (including the US, Europe and New Zealand) tried geophysical techniques, instruments and ideas for future crewed missions to cave systems on Mars.

Mars2013 – Morocco Mars Simulation 2013 

Between 1 and 28 February 2013, the Austrian Space Forum – in partnership with the Ibn Battuta Center in Marrakesh – conducted an integrated Mars analogue field simulation in the northern Sahara near Erfoud, Morocco within the framework of the PolAres research programme. Directed by a Mission Support Center in Innsbruck, Austria, a small field crew conducted experiments preparing for future human Mars missions mainly in the fields of engineering, planetary surface operations, astrobiology, geophysics/geology and life sciences. Two space suit simulators (both Aouda.X and the new Aouda.S)  and a number of rovers were used in the field.

The desert base camp at the northern location was named Camp Weyprecht on February 11. There was also a satellite location about 80 km further south that was named Station Payer. These names were in honor of the two leaders of the Austro-Hungarian North Pole Expedition of 1872–74, which tied in with the long-term goal of the PolAres research programme to do an analog expedition to the arctic.

AMADEE-15 – Kaunertal Glacier Mission 

From August 3 to 15, 2015, a two-week Mars simulation called "AMADEE-15",  together with international partners, took place on an ice and boulder glacier in Kaunertal, Austria. Again for this mission, the field crew was supported by a Mission Support Center in Innsbruck, Austria. The experiments conducted covered several disciplines and ranged from geological and astrobiological to robotic and technical experiments. For the first time, this mission also included virtual exploration. The analog astronaut moved around on a simulation platform wearing video goggles and, like the other test astronauts, was in radio contact with mission control. The procedure (V-ERAS) was developed by the Italian Mars Society.

Scientific publications on this Mars simulation:
 Lichenometry and Schmidt hammer tests in the Kaunertal glacier foreland (Ötztal Alps) during the AMADEE-15 Mars Mission Simulation
 C. Markovski, J.M. Byrne, E. Lalla, A.D. Lozano-Gorrín, G. Klingelhöfer, F. Rull, A. Kappler, T. Hoffmann, C. Schröder: Abiotic versus biotic iron mineral transformation studied by a miniaturized backscattering Mössbauer spectrometer (MIMOS II), X-ray diffraction and Raman spectroscopy. In: Icarus. Band 296, Nummer , 2017, S. 49–58, .
 Gernot Groemer, Anna Losiak, Alexander Soucek, Clemens Plank, Laura Zanardini, Nina Sejkora, Sebastian Sams: The AMADEE-15 Mars simulation. In: Acta Astronautica. Band 129, Nummer , 2016, S. 277–290, .

AMADEE Program 
AMADEE is the flagship program of the OeWF which builds on the PolAres Mars research program and is expected to run from 2018 to 2028. As a framework, it is responsible for developing hardware, workflows, and science for future human-robotic planetary surface missions. A major focus of the Program is to develop life trace detection strategies. Unlike PolAres, the AMADEE Program's simulated planetary surfaces are not limited to Mars, but will introduce the ability to study surface operations on other celestial bodies (e.g. the Moon).

AMADEE-18 Mars Simulation, Oman 
The AMADEE-18 Mars simulation took place in February 2018 in the Dhofar desert in the south of the Sultanate of Oman. This simulated Mars expedition was conducted for the first time as part of the AMADEE program, in conjunction with the Oman National Steering Committee for AMADEE-18. A special issue of Astrobiology Magazine was published in November 2020.

AMADEE-20 Mars Simulation, Israel 
The AMADEE-20 Mars Simulation took place from 4 to 31 October 2021 in the Negev Desert, Israel. This analog mission took place in cooperation with the Israel Space Agency as well as D-MARS. This mission was planned for 2020 but was postponed by one year due to COVID-19.

ADLER-1 cubesat 
Launched on January 13, 2022 22:51 UTC, the ADLER-1 cubesat orbits Earth at an altitude of about 500 km to detect space debris with particle sizes "in the micrometer range" for at least one year. The cubesat is 30x10x10 cm by size and was launched with the LauncherOne rocket by Virgin Orbit from California.

The acronym ADLER is composed of Austria Debris Detection Low Earth (Orbit) Reconnoiter. The probe's main instrument, the Austrian Particle Impact Detector (APID), was developed at the OeWF laboratory in Innsbruck. The entire ADLER-1 project cost a larger six-figure euro amount and was privately funded, by Findus Venture GmbH, Austria. The company Spire Global, California contributed its Lemur class small satellite and is responsible for the launch logistics as well as the operation of the small satellite.

References

External links 

Spacesuits
Human analog missions
Space policy
Space program of Austria